The 1968 Buffalo Bulls football team represented the University at Buffalo in the 1968 NCAA University Division football season. The Bulls offense scored 195 points while the defense allowed 183 points.

Schedule

References

Buffalo
Buffalo Bulls football seasons
Buffalo Bulls football